Kirkota was a town of ancient Cilicia inhabited during Byzantine times. Its name does not occur in ancient authors but is inferred from epigraphic and other evidence. 

Its site is located near Kızıldere in Asiatic Turkey.

References

Populated places in ancient Cilicia
Former populated places in Turkey
Populated places of the Byzantine Empire
History of Adana Province